National Road 36 or State Highway 36 is a road of northeastern Burma.

Roads in Myanmar